Top of the World may refer to:

Film
 The Top of the World (film), a lost 1925 American silent film directed by George Melford
 Top of the World (1955 film), an American film directed by Lewis R. Foster
 Top of the World (1997 film), an American film directed by Sidney J. Furie

Literature
 The Top of the World (novel), a 1920 novel by Ethel M. Dell
 Top of the World, a 1950 novel by Hans Ruesch

Music

Albums
 Top of the World (Jimmy Sturr album), 2002
 Top of the World (Lynn Anderson album) or the title song (see below), 1973
 Top of the World (Slightly Stoopid album) or the title song, 2012

Songs
 "Top of the World" (The All-American Rejects song), 2006
 "Top of the World" (Brandy song), 1998
 "Top of the World" (Bridgit Mendler song), 2013
 "Top of the World" (The Carpenters song), 1972; covered by Lynn Anderson, 1973
 "Top of the World" (The Cataracs song), 2011
 "Top of the World" (D'banj song), 2012
 "Top of the World" (Dixie Chicks song), 2004
 "Top of the World" (Khwezi song), 2015
 "Top of the World" (Kimbra song), 2017
 "Top of the World" (Rascalz song), 2000
 "Top of the World" (Tim McGraw song), 2015
 "Top of the World" (Van Halen song), 1991
 "Top of the World" (The Wildhearts song), 2003
 "Top of the World (Olé, Olé, Olé)", by Chumbawamba, 1998
 "Top of the World", by Ace Hood from Gutta, 2008
 "Top of the World", by Big Bang from Big Bang, 2009
 "Top of the World", by Diana Ross from Baby It's Me, 1977
 "Top of the World", by Five Finger Death Punch from And Justice for None, 2018
 "Top of the World", by Gotthard from Human Zoo, 2003
 "Top of the World", by Greek Fire, 2013
 "Top of the World", by James from Gold Mother, 1990
 "Top of the World", by Jill Johnson from Baby Blue Paper, 2008
 "Top of the World", by Mai Kuraki from Touch Me!, 2009
 "Top of the World", by Mandy Moore from the soundtrack for Stuart Little 2, 2002
 "Top of the World", by Mike Posner, 2013
 "Top of the World", by Owl City from The Midsummer Station, 2012
 "Top of the World", by Powerman 5000 from Transform, 2003
 "Top of the World", by the Pussycat Dolls from Doll Domination, 2008
 "Top of the World", by Raghav from The Phoenix, 2012
 "Top of the World", by Shawn Mendes from the Lyle, Lyle, Crocodile film soundtrack, 2022
 "Top of the World (The Glass Bead Game)", by Jon Anderson from In the City of Angels, 1988

Other
 Top of the World Tour, a 2003 Dixie Chicks concert tour
 Top of the World Tour: Live, an album of the above tour
 Top of the World Tour: Live (DVD), a video of the above tour
 Top of the World International Piano Competition, an event in Tromsø, Norway

Places
 Top-of-the-World, Arizona, US, a census-designated place
 Top of the World, Tennessee, US, an unincorporated community
 Top of the World (park), Laguna Beach, California, US
 Top of the World Provincial Park, British Columbia, Canada

Other uses
 Top of the World (ride), an amusement ride in Freizeit-Land Geiselwind, Germany
 Top of the World (Wadsworth), a 1943 painting by Edward Wadsworth
 Top of the World Highway, which connects Alaska, US, with The Yukon, Canada
 Top of the World Trade Center Observatories, a former observation deck in New York City, New York, US
 Top of the World Windpower Project, a proposed wind farm in Wyoming, US
 Top of the World, a restaurant in The Strat, Las Vegas, Nevada, US

See also
 On Top of the World (disambiguation)
 Sitting on Top of the World (disambiguation)
 Roof of the World (disambiguation)